Haruya (written: 遥也 or 陽也) is a masculine Japanese given name. Notable people with the name include:

, Japanese footballer
, Japanese footballer

Japanese masculine given names